Esqueixada  is a traditional Catalan dish, a salad of shredded salt cod, tomatoes, onions, olive oil and vinegar, salt, and sometimes a garnish of olives or hard-boiled eggs. Specific recipes vary, with some including ingredients such as eggplant and bell peppers. Esqueixada is particularly popular in warm weather and is sometimes considered a summertime dish. It is often served as a tapas dish.

Esqueixada is sometimes described as the "Catalan ceviche" because it is made with raw fish (although the cod is salt-cured and dried) in a marinade. The name of the dish comes from the Catalan verb esqueixar, to tear or shred. The salt cod in the dish is always shredded with the fingers, never sliced or chopped, to achieve the correct texture.

See also
salvitxada
esgarrat
 List of salads

Notes

Catalan cuisine
Uncooked fish dishes
Vinegar
Tomato dishes
Raw fish salads
Olive dishes
Cold foods
Tapas